Sir Arthur Atye or Atey (died 1604) was an English academic and politician.

Life
Atye graduated B.A. at Christ Church, Oxford in 1560, and M.A. in 1564. A fellow of Merton College, Oxford, he became Principal of St Alban Hall in 1572. Between 1566 and 1568 he went with John Man on a diplomatic mission in Spain.

He acted as secretary to Robert Dudley, 1st Earl of Leicester. Later he worked for Robert Devereux, 2nd Earl of Essex, and translated political works from Spanish. He was knighted in 1603.

Atye was also one of the trading group in Leicester's circle involved in commerce with Morocco, with Alexander Avenon and Richard Staper. The merchant Benedict Barnham left money to Atye and his wife.

Atye was residing at Kilburn when he died; he owned property in several other locations around London, including Harrow-on-the-Hill where he was buried. His eldest son and heir Robert was still a minor.

Family
Atye married first Anne Quarles, the widow of William Ricthorne, who died in 1583; there were no children of the marriage. He then Judith, daughter of Walter Hungerford of Cadenham. Wiltshire. They had three or four sons, and a daughter. His widow married Sir John Dormer.

Notes

Year of birth missing
1604 deaths
Fellows of Merton College, Oxford
Principals of St Alban Hall, Oxford
English MPs 1572–1583
English MPs 1584–1585
English MPs 1589
English MPs 1593
English MPs 1597–1598
English MPs 1604–1611
Members of the Parliament of England (pre-1707) for Liverpool
Members of the Parliament of England for Bere Alston